R. aromatica may refer to:
 Ravensara aromatica, the clove nutmeg, a plant species found in Madagascar
 Rhus aromatica, the fragrant sumac, a plant species native to Canada and the United States

See also 
 Aromatica